Indianapolis is an unincorporated community in Mahaska County, Iowa, United States.

Indianapolis contained a post office from 1850 until 1902. Indianapolis was named by settlers from Indianapolis, Indiana in the late 1840s.

References

Unincorporated communities in Mahaska County, Iowa
Unincorporated communities in Iowa
1850 establishments in Iowa
Populated places established in 1850